C Lalrinsanga (born 13 April 1986) is an Indian cricketer. He made his List A debut on 20 September 2018, for Mizoram in the 2018–19 Vijay Hazare Trophy. He made his first-class debut on 1 November 2018, for Mizoram in the 2018–19 Ranji Trophy.

References

External links
 

1986 births
Living people
Indian cricketers
Mizoram cricketers
Place of birth missing (living people)